Paracles fosterana is a moth of the subfamily Arctiinae first described by Watson and Goodger in 1986. It is found in Paraguay.

References

Moths described in 1986
Paracles